Tatsuya Mitsuhashi (born 14 January 1973) is a Japanese professional golfer.

Mitsuhashi played on the Japan Golf Tour, winning once.

Professional wins (1)

Japan Golf Tour wins (1)

External links

Japanese male golfers
Japan Golf Tour golfers
Sportspeople from Hiroshima Prefecture
1973 births
Living people